Trapania darwini is a species of sea slug, a dorid nudibranch, a marine gastropod mollusc in the family Goniodorididae.

Distribution
This species was first described from Española Island, Galapagos Islands.

Description
This goniodorid nudibranch is translucent white in colour, with an reticulate pattern of brown patches on the body. The tips of the rhinophores, gills, lateral papillae, oral tentacles and tail are yellow. Trapania goslineri has a similar pattern of colour except that the brown patches do not have white spots within them.

Ecology
Trapania darwini probably feeds on Entoprocta which often grow on sponges and other living substrata.

References

Goniodorididae
Gastropods described in 2008